Newry and Armagh is a parliamentary constituency in the United Kingdom House of Commons. The current MP is Mickey Brady of Sinn Féin.

Boundaries

1983–1997: The District of Armagh, and the District of Newry and Mourne wards of Ballybot, Belleek, Bessbrook, Camlough, Creggan, Crossmaglen, Daisy Hill, Derrymore, Drumalane, Drumgullion, Fathom, Forkhill, Newtownhamilton, St Mary's, St Patrick's, Tullyhappy, and Windsor Hill.

1997–present: The District of Armagh, and the District of Newry and Mourne wards of Ballybot, Bessbrook, Camlough, Creggan, Crossmaglen, Daisy Hill, Derrymore, Drumgullion, Drumalane, Fathom, Forkhill, Newtownhamilton, Silver Bridge, St Mary's, St Patrick's, Tullyhappy, and Windsor Hill.

The seat was created in boundary changes in 1983, as part of an expansion of Northern Ireland's constituencies from 12 to 17, and was predominantly made up from the old Armagh constituency with the addition of Newry town from the old South Down constituency. In 1995, the Boundary Commission originally proposed to abolish the seat with the Armagh district joining most of Dungannon in a new 'Blackwater' constituency with the rest becoming part of a new Newry and Mourne constituency. This was strongly opposed during the local enquiries and the eventual boundary review did not implement it. The constituency contains the entirety of the former Armagh district and the Newry half of the former Newry and Mourne district.

History
For the history of the equivalent constituency prior to 1983, please see Armagh.

The constituency is majority nationalist, though initially on its creation in 1983 Jim Nicholson of the Ulster Unionist Party won the seat due to the nationalist vote being divided between the Social Democratic and Labour Party and Sinn Féin. In 1986 Nicholson, along with all the other unionist MPs, resigned his seat in protest over the Anglo-Irish Agreement and stood in a by-election to provide voters the opportunity to decide on it. However the nationalist parties contested the seat and Seamus Mallon of the SDLP gained sufficient votes to outpoll Nicholson and win the seat. Mallon held it until his retirement in 2005.

The main attention has been upon the rise of the Sinn Féin vote. In the 2001 election they surged forward, cutting Mallon's majority drastically, as well as heavily outpolling the SDLP in the equivalent area local elections held on the same day. Then in the 2003 Assembly election Sinn Féin won three seats to the SDLP's one. Mallon stood down at the 2005 general election fearing the loss of his seat as was widely predicted among political pundits, the seat subsequently fell to Sinn Féin with Murphy out polling the SDLP by almost 8000 votes.

Newry is overwhelmingly nationalist, and was one of two districts in Northern Ireland to return a numerical majority of people identifying themselves as "Irish" at the 2011 census at 52.1% Irish.
Armagh is more unionist, though it does have a larger proportion of people identifying as "Irish" in comparison to the Northern Ireland average at 44.4% "British" 32.4% "Irish".

Members of Parliament
The Member of Parliament since the 2015 general election is Mickey Brady of Sinn Féin. He succeeded his party colleague, Conor Murphy who had gained the seat from the SDLP in 2005.

Election results

Elections in the 2010s

Elections in the 2000s

Elections in the 1990s 

1997 Changes are compared to the 1992 notional results shown below.

Elections in the 1980s

See also 
List of parliamentary constituencies in Northern Ireland
Newry and Armagh (Assembly constituency)

References

External links 
2017 Election House Of Commons Library 2017 Election report
A Vision Of Britain Through Time (Constituency elector numbers)
Politics Resources

Constituencies of the Parliament of the United Kingdom established in 1983
Westminster Parliamentary constituencies in Northern Ireland
Politics of Newry
Politics of Armagh (city)
Politics of County Armagh
Politics of County Down